= Kadırga Park =

Park in Istanbul, Turkey

- Kadırga Parkı
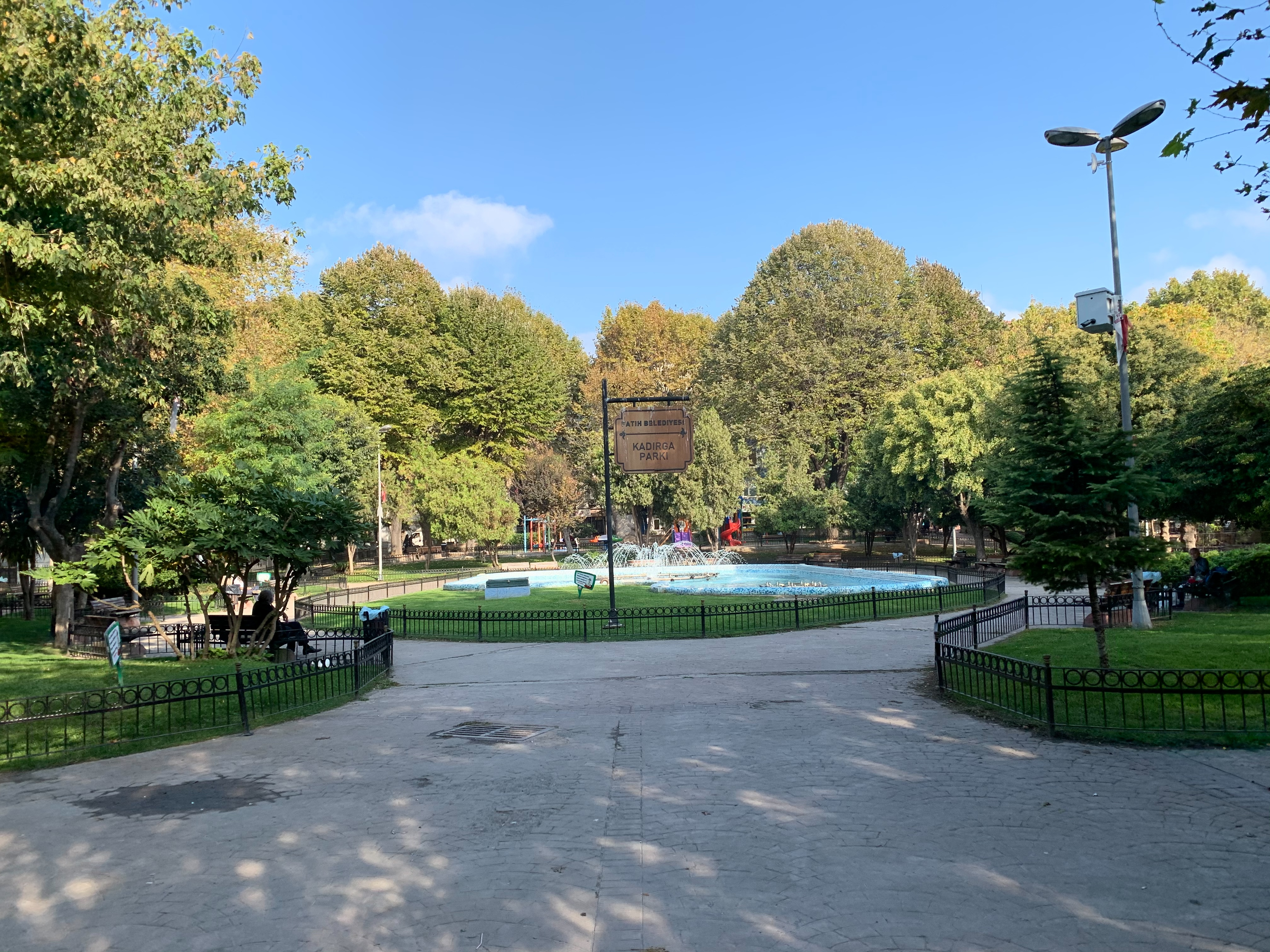
- The park in 2019
- Location: Istanbul, Turkey
- Coordinates: 41°00′17″N 28°58′09″E

Kadırga Park (Turkish: Kadırga Parkı) is a park in Istanbul, Turkey.
